SS Robert M. T. Hunter (MC contract 348) was a Liberty ship built in the United States during World War II. She was named after Robert Mercer Taliaferro Hunter, an American statesman.

The ship was laid down on December 11, 1942, then launched on March 28, 1943. She was charter with the Maritime Commission and War Shipping Administration.  The ship survived the war only to suffer the same fate as nearly all other Liberty ships that survived did; she was scrapped in 1971.

References 

Liberty ships
Ships built in Savannah, Georgia
1943 ships